Rummanah is a Palestinian village located  northwest of the city of Jenin in the northern West Bank. According to the Palestinian Central Bureau of Statistics (PCBS), the town had a population of  3,372 inhabitants in mid-year 2006.

History

The  SWP  found cisterns cut in the rock and a well. Dauphin described the place as being an ancient village on a hill slope, with traces of ancient remains, including cisterns and caves carved into rock.

Ottoman era
Rumana, like the rest of Palestine, was incorporated into the Ottoman Empire in 1517, and in the census of 1596, the village was located in the nahiya of Sara in the liwa of Lajjun. It had a population of 12 households, all Muslim. The villagers paid a fixed tax-rate of 25% on agricultural products, including wheat, barley, summer crops, olive trees,  goats and beehives, in addition to occasional revenues; a total of 9,000  akçe.

The Dutch lieutenant van der Velde travelled in the area in 1851–2. He noted that Scottish missionaries in 1839 had found many old wells and other old remains in the area. He also described the village (called Rumuni) as being small, and identified it with ancient Hadad-Rimon (see Zacahriah xii, 11).
French explorer Victor Guérin visited the village in 1863 and 1870, and described it as being reduced to "twenty miserable dwellings". He did not notice any traces of antiquity, except for a few cisterns in the rock and a working well. Guérin agreed that the village was Hadad-Rimon, but disagreed with Jeromes assertion that Hadad-Rimon was identical with Maximianopolis.

In the 1882 the PEF's Survey of Western Palestine (SWP), the village (called Rummaneh) was described as: A small village of mud and stone, near the foot of the hills, with wells to the west and olives below. This village seems to mark the site of Maximianopolis, a town 20 Roman miles from Caesarea and 10 miles from Jezreel (Zer'in), the ancient name of Maximianopolis being, according to Jerome, "Hadad Rimmon".

British Mandate era
In the  1922 census of Palestine conducted by the British Mandate authorities, Rumaneh had a population of 548, all Muslim, increasing in the 1931 census to 644, still all Muslim, in 151 houses. 

In the 1945 statistics, the population of Rummana (including Khirbat Salim) was 880 Muslims while the total land area was 21,676 dunams, according to an official land and population survey. Of this, 2,876 dunams were allocated for plantations and irrigable land, 10,507 for cereals, while 27 dunams were classified as built-up areas.

Jordanian era
In the wake of the 1948 Arab–Israeli War and the 1949 Armistice Agreements, Rummanah came under Jordanian rule.

The Jordanian census of 1961 found 1,214 inhabitants.

post-1967
Since the Six-Day War in 1967, Rummanah has been under Israeli occupation.

Footnotes

Bibliography

 

 
 

 
  

  
  (p. 106)

External links
 Welcome To Rummana
Survey of Western Palestine, Map 8: IAA, Wikimedia commons 

Villages in the West Bank
Jenin Governorate
Municipalities of the State of Palestine